Vinicio Ron (born 26 February 1954) is an Ecuadorian footballer. He played in 25 matches for the Ecuador national football team from 1976 to 1984. He was also part of Ecuador's squad for the 1979 Copa América tournament.

References

External links
 

1954 births
Living people
Ecuadorian footballers
Footballers from Quito
Ecuador international footballers
Association football midfielders
C.S.D. Macará managers